Deepak Agrawal  born 10 November 1970, is a professor neurosurgery at All India Institute of Medical Sciences, New Delhi is one of the top 10 surgeons in the neurosurgery. During his stint as chairman computarization, he reformed the ICT processes at AIIMS, New Delhi and also helped patients in All India Institute of Medical Sciences, New Delhi to get a Unique Health Identification (UHID), which documents their journey in the hospital. He also pioneered stem cell research in spinal cord injury in India. Dr. Agrawal has pioneered DREZotomy technique for neuropathic pain in India and has refined the procedure to make it safer and more accessible to patients.

Agrawal was responsible for the care of Baby Falak and raising the issue in the media which led a national outcry against Child Abuse and Human trafficking.

He developed an UHID system in AIIMS to take appointment easily through ors.gov.in portal.

During the COVID-19 pandemic, Agrawal developed mechanical AgVa Ventilator in collaboration with Indian scientist Diwakar Vaish of A-SET Robotics.

He has been editor-in-chief of the Journal of Peripheral Nerve Surgery (JPNS) since 2019, and editor-in-chief of the Indian Journal of Neurotrauma (IJNT) since April 2019.

He has more than 2500 citations on his published research with an h-index of 28 and i10-index of 69 as on 26 April 2022.

Awards 
'CNS-CSNS young neurosurgeon of the year' award by the US Congress of Neurological Surgeons (CNS) at the annual CNS meeting in September 2008 at San Diego, California.
‘Tata Innovation Fellowship’ by DBT for a 3-year period from 2013 of Rs 22.5 lakhs.
"Dynamic CIO of the Year 2016" in the fifth Annual Healthcare Summit.
AAPI International research award (1st prize) in 'Innovation in healthcare' at Global health summit (2016).

References

External links 
 

Living people
1970 births
Academic staff of the All India Institute of Medical Sciences, New Delhi
Indian neurosurgeons